"Answerphone" is a song recorded by Canadian production duo Banx & Ranx and English singer Ella Eyre featuring English rapper Yxng Bane. The song was released by Parlophone on 16 March 2018. It reached number five on the UK Singles Chart on 25 May 2018.

It was co-written by Banx & Ranx, Jacob Manson, Ella Eyre, Yxng Bane and Shakka.

Music video
A music video to accompany the release of "Answerphone" was first released onto YouTube on 16 March 2018, through Banx & Ranx's official YouTube account.

Track listing

Charts

Weekly charts

Year-end charts

Certifications

Release history

References

2018 singles
2018 songs
Dancehall songs
Electro songs
Ella Eyre songs
Yxng Bane songs
Songs written by Ella Eyre
Songs written by Jacob Manson
Parlophone singles